Nuzzle and Scratch is a British children's television programme, shown on CBeebies from 1 Sep 2008 and ran for three series with two spin offs up to 4 Mar 2011. The show also aired on Disney Channel preschool block Playhouse Disney in the United States as well as the international CBeebies channels in Poland and Australia. They showed two spin offs Hoof And Safety and Frock And Roll. The show aired on CBeebies in the UK.

It stars two eponymous puppet alpacas created and developed by Barry Quinn and Alan Robinson and written by various writers.

Information
The show starts with a beautiful scene of the Andes which is where Nuzzle and Scratch are originally from: (We're from high up in the Andes, we've got hooves instead of handies) Each episode follows the same format, Nuzzle and Scratch work for '2 by 2, The Any Animal Agency'. run by The Boss, a tough-talking girl. She receives a phone call from someone who is in desperate need of some assistance. Unfortunately all her hard working animals are out already and the only free hands (or hooves) available are the two alpacas Nuzzle and Scratch. The Boss knows they aren't any good so is reluctant to send them, but there is usually some misunderstanding over the phone and they end up getting the job. Nuzzle and Scratch mess up and the person rings the Boss to complain. She convinces them to 'give them another chance' and Nuzzle and Scratch normally turn things around and really impress the person who hired them. They often win a rosette or get offered a permanent job but refuse leading them to go on their next assignment.

Nuzzle and Scratch like to climb mountains and will go up anything that looks like a mountain e.g. piles of clothes. However, Nuzzle is scared of heights and when he climbs to the top he gets scared and Scratch has to save him.

Alpacas like to herd. When Nuzzle and Scratch see a lot of things, or if they get scared, they say 'herd up' and begin herding.

At some point in the episode, someone will say that they need to 'start from Scratch'. Nuzzle gets upset about this and asks why can't they start from Nuzzle. Usually the person is very confused but agrees to 'start from Nuzzle' instead. In the painting and decorating episode, Scratch complains that they always 'start from Nuzzle', and they actually do 'start from Scratch'.

Nuzzle and Scratch have some catchphrases:- 'Is it snack time yet?', 'No job's too easy', 'Working can be fun'.

Both Nuzzle and Scratch are completely distinct in thoughts and are actually opposites of each other:

Nuzzle is neat, quiet, shy, nervous, and easily scared, as well as cautious.

Scratch is silly, loud, friendly, free-spirited, energetic, and optimistic.

Characters

Main characters
The main characters appear in every episode.

Nuzzle
Nuzzle (performed by Neil Sterenberg) is a white alpaca that likes to climb mountains but he is afraid of heights. He saves a lot of other characters in the episodes. He doesn't like starting from "Scratch" and wants to start from "Nuzzle".

Scratch
Scratch (performed by Dave Chapman) is a brown alpaca that mainly likes whatever. He likes telling Nuzzle what to do and usually gets Nuzzle in trouble. Unlike Nuzzle, he is energetic and optimistic.

The Boss
The Boss (played by Eve De Leon Allen) is the young girl who sends Nuzzle and Scratch to the job.

Miss Mulberry
Miss Mulberry (played by Sally Bankes) is the safety supervisor that appeared in the spin-off Hoof and Safety that trains Nuzzle and Scratch to be safe around hazards.

Captain Carrington
Captain Carrington (played by Ian Kirkby) is the owner of the Frock 'n' Roll dress shop, as well as Nuzzle and Scratch's owner, helping choose costumes for the twins with Nuzzle and Scratch testing them for a job. He brought up Nuzzle and Scratch from when he was doing his expeditions in the Andes and brought them to England when they were young.

The Twins
The Twins (played by Eva and Ella Diakite) are frequent customers at Frock 'n' Roll waiting for their costumes after Nuzzle and Scratch test them out delivering them on time.

Other characters
The other characters appear in very few episodes.
This is a list of other characters:

Songs

Theme Tune

Hoof and Safety

Working Can Be Fun

Episodes

Episode List
Nuzzle (performed by Neil Sterenberg), Scratch (performed by Dave Chapman) and The Boss (Eve De Leon Allen) appear in all of the episodes. These do not appear in the 'Other Credits' column.

Spin-off
A spin-off called Hoof and Safety With Nuzzle and Scratch premiered airing on CBeebies on 1 March 2010. It ran for 13 episodes every day except Wednesday until 22 March 2010.  Nuzzle And Scratch learn how to be safe with the help of Miss Mulberry (Sally Banks). A Second spin-off Nuzzle and Scratch: Frock and Roll premiered on CBeebies on 7 February 2011. It ran for 20 episodes and ended on 4 March 2011. Nuzzle and Scratch have landed a Job at the Frock And Roll Fancy Dress Shop owned by Captain Carrington (Ian Kirkby). With Costumes for every occasion mostly for the Twins (Eva and Ella Diakite), each day brings a new opportunity for adventure. They also Aired On CBeebies.

References

External links
 
BBC website article

2000s British children's television series
2004 British television series debuts
2006 British television series endings
2000s preschool education television series
British preschool education television series
British television shows featuring puppetry
English-language television shows
BBC children's television shows
CBeebies
Television series about mammals
Fictional camelids
Television series about twins
Television series by BBC Studios
Alpacas